"Llueve el amor" (English: It Rains Love) is a song by Puerto Rican singer-songwriter Tito El Bambino. It was released as the first single on November 26, 2010, from the album, El Patrón: Invencible (2011). The Banda version of the song is also in his album which features Banda El Recodo. The theme was used for the opening sequence of the telenovela Eva Luna.

Music video
The music video for "Llueve el Amor" was directed by Gustavo Camacho and was filmed in Aspen, Colorado, New Orleans, Louisiana and Bogotá and Cartagena in Colombia.

Track listing
Digital download
"Llueve El Amor" – 3:56

Official Versions
Llueve El Amor [Original Version] – featuring Lucero
Llueve El Amor [Banda Version] – featuring Banda El Recodo
Llueve El Amor [Salsa Version] – featuring Jerry Rivera

Charts

Release history

References

2010 singles
Tito El Bambino songs
Banda el Recodo songs
Record Report Top Latino number-one singles
Record Report Top 100 number-one singles
2010 songs
Songs written by Tito El Bambino
Jerry Rivera songs